Edward Arthur Alexander Shackleton, Baron Shackleton,  (15 July 1911 – 22 September 1994) was a British geographer, Royal Air Force officer and Labour Party politician.

Early life and career
Born in Wandsworth, London, Shackleton was the younger son of Emily Mary and Sir Ernest Shackleton, the Antarctic explorer.  The young Edward Shackleton was educated at Radley College, a boarding independent school for boys near the village of Radley in Oxfordshire, followed by Magdalen College at the University of Oxford.

Shackleton arranged the 1932 Oxford University Exploration Club expedition to Sarawak in Borneo organised by Tom Harrisson. During this trip he was the first to attain the peak of Mount Mulu.

In 1934 Shackleton organised the Oxford University Ellesmere Land Expedition and chose Gordon Noel Humphreys to lead it. Shackleton accompanied the party as the assistant surveyor to Humphreys. The expedition was eventually responsible for naming Mount Oxford (after the University of Oxford) and the British Empire Range.  On leaving university, he worked as a Talks Producer for the BBC in Northern Ireland – an experience that turned him away from the Conservative Party towards Labour.

Royal Air Force service
Shackleton served in the Royal Air Force (RAF) during the Second World War. On 29 July 1940, he was commissioned into the Administrative and Special Duties Branch, Royal Air Force Volunteer Reserve, as a pilot officer on probation. On 1 March 1941, he was promoted and granted the war substantive rank of flying officer. Following the probationary period, his commission was confirmed on 29 July 1941. He was promoted to flight lieutenant (temporary) on 1 September 1942, and made a war substantive flight lieutenant on 15 February 1944. He was an acting squadron leader by June 1944, and an acting wing commander by June 1945.

In 1944, Shackleton was mentioned in despatches. In the 1945 King's Birthday Honours, he was appointed an Officer of the Order of the British Empire (OBE).

Shackleton relinquished his commission on 15 July 1956 and was granted permission to retain the rank of wing commander.

Political life
He stood unsuccessfully for Labour at Epsom in the 1945 general election and in the 1945 Bournemouth by-election. In 1946, Shackleton was elected as Labour Member of Parliament for Preston in a by-election.  In 1949 Attlee appointed him PPS to Minister of Supply, George Strauss.

A boundary change divided Preston into two seats, and he was elected MP for Preston South on a much-reduced majority.  The following year he was promoted to be PPS to Lord President of the Council and Foreign Secretary, Herbert Morrison, one of the heavyweight political figures in the post-war government.  He was re-elected in 1951.

In 1955, he was defeated and so Hugh Gaitskell recommended Shackleton to the Prime Minister.  He was created a life peer by letters patent as Baron Shackleton, of Burley in the County of Southampton on 11 August 1958. Lord Shackleton delivered his maiden speech on 11 November in a debate on Wages Councils, a bill he thoroughly approved and welcomed to increase understanding between unions and management.

In Harold Wilson's government, he served as Minister of Defence for the RAF 1964–67.  He was sworn of the Privy Council in 1966, and made Deputy Leader of the House of Lords a year later.  As Minister without Portfolio 1967–1968 and Paymaster General 1968 he had a seat on the cabinet.  During the Aden Emergency he was sent on a Special Mission as British Resident to help with the withdrawal.

Typically promoted by Wilson in an April, after the budget, he was made Leader of the House of Lords from 1968–70, and subsequently sat as Opposition Leader in the House of Lords.

He was used again on the Wilsonian reforms proposed for the Lords, liaising between committees and sub-committees, designed to reduce the Lords delaying powers from two years to just six months, but the Prime Minister dropped the bill in April 1969 to "concentrate on priorities."  Sitting on the committee for Civil Service Reform he successfully widened access to entry for scientists.

From 1971, Shackleton was President of the Royal Geographical Society. Lord Shackleton was appointed a Knight Companion of the Order of the Garter in 1974. From 1976 until 1992 he was Chairman of the joint-Political Honours and Scrutiny Committee.  Lord Shackleton's report, commissioned by James Callaghan described the economic future of the Falkland Islands, the value of the being British to the islanders, and how their lot could be improved.  It included the invaluable role eventually played by HMS Endurance.

Between 1988-89 he chaired the Lords Science and Technology Committee, which culminated in 1989 when he was elected a Fellow of the Royal Society under Statute 12 (effectively an honorary member). He also served as Chairman of the East European Trade Council

In 1990 Shackleton was appointed an honorary Companion of the Order of Australia (AC), Australia's highest civilian honour, "for service to Australian/British relations, particularly through the Britain–Australia Society.

Lord Shackleton was Pro-Chancellor of the University of Southampton, in which role he was deeply interested in the development of geography at Southampton. A portrait photograph of Lord Shackleton was unveiled by his daughter Alexandra Shackleton in December 1997 in the university's Shackleton Building, which houses the Departments of Geography and Psychology.

In 1994 he became the Life President of the newly founded James Caird Society, named after the boat in which his explorer father and crew escaped Antarctica (itself, in turn, named for James Key Caird [1837–1916], jute baron and philanthropist). He acted also as patron of the British Schools Exploring Society (B.S.E.S.) from 1962 until his death in the New Forest aged 83.

Personal life
In 1938 Shackleton married Betty Homan, and they had two children, Alexandra (born 1940) and Charles (1942-1979).

Arms
{{Infobox emblem wide
|image = Coat of Arms of Edward Shackleton, Baron Shackleton, KG, AC, OBE, PC, FRS, FRGS.png
|image size = 200
|notes = 
|escutcheon = Or on a Fess Gules three Lozengy Buckles tongues palewise of the field, on a Canton of the second a Cross Humettée of the field.
|crest = A Poplar Tree proper charged with a Buckle as in the arms
|orders = Order of the Garter (Appointed 23 April 1974)
|motto = 'FORTITUDINE VINCIMIS (BY ENDURANCE WE CONQUER)}}

Lord Shackleton's Garter banner, which hung in St. George's Chapel in Windsor during his lifetime, is now on display in Christ Church Cathedral, Falkland Islands.

References

Bibliography

 Hattersley-Smith, Geoffrey. Geographical Names of the Ellesmere Island National Park Reserve and Vicinity''. Calgary, Alberta, Canada: Arctic Institute of North America, 1998. .

External links

University of Southampton website ("Shackleton portrait unveiled in Geography Department")
BSES
Archive collection of Edward Shackleton collection with bio/history
 
 Parliamentary Archives, Papers of Arthur Edward Alexander Shackleton MP, Baron Shackleton, 1911-1994

Ernest Shackleton
1911 births
1994 deaths
Alumni of Magdalen College, Oxford
British Secretaries of State
English geographers
Fellows of the Royal Geographical Society
Fellows of the Royal Society (Statute 12)
Honorary Companions of the Order of Australia
Knights of the Garter
Labour Party (UK) MPs for English constituencies
Shackleton of Burley
Leaders of the House of Lords
Lords Privy Seal
Members of the Privy Council of the United Kingdom
Ministers in the Wilson governments, 1964–1970
Officers of the Order of the British Empire
People associated with the University of Southampton
People educated at Radley College
People from Wandsworth
Shackleton, Edward Arthur Alexander
Royal Canadian Geographical Society fellows
Secretaries of State for Air (UK)
UK MPs 1945–1950
UK MPs 1950–1951
UK MPs 1951–1955
UK MPs who were granted peerages
United Kingdom Paymasters General
Life peers created by Elizabeth II
Royal Air Force officers
Royal Air Force Volunteer Reserve personnel of World War II